Torsten Mattuschka (born 4 October 1980) is a German former professional footballer who played as a midfielder. He works as the current assistant manager of VSG Altglienicke.

References

External links
 

Living people
1980 births
Sportspeople from Cottbus
German footballers
Association football midfielders
Bundesliga players
2. Bundesliga players
3. Liga players
FC Energie Cottbus players
FC Energie Cottbus II players
1. FC Union Berlin players
VSG Altglienicke players
Footballers from Brandenburg
1. FC Union Berlin non-playing staff